The following mining disasters have occurred in Poland:

1565 – Golden Donkey in Złoty Stok – 59 killed.
1880 – Renard coal mine in Sosnowiec – 200 killed.
1896 – Kleofas coal mine in Katowice –  105 killed.
1913 - Emma coal mine in Radlin - 17 killed
1923 – Rozbark in Bytom – 145 killed.
1931 – Wacław coal mine in Nowa Ruda – 151 killed.
1941 – Nowa Ruda coal mine in Nowa Ruda – 180 killed.
1954, 21 March – Barbara-Wyzwolenie coal mine in Chorzów – 81–102 killed.
1958, 28 August – Makoszowy coal mine in Zabrze – 72 killed. 
1971, 23 March – Rokitnica coal mine in Zabrze – 10 killed (after seven days rescuers found Alojzy Piątek alive). 
1974, 28 June – Silesia coal mine in Czechowice-Dziedzice – 34 killed. 
1978, 5 July – Staszic coal mine in Katowice – 4 killed. 
1979, 10 October – Dymitrow coal mine in Bytom – 34 killed. 
1979, 30 October – Silesia coal mine in Czechowice-Dziedzice – 22 killed (twenty days after disaster in Dymitrow). 
1982, 29–30 November – Dymitrow coal mine in Bytom – 19 killed.
1985, 22 December – Wałbrzych coal mine in Wałbrzych – 18 killed. 
1987, 4 February – Mysłowice coal mine in Mysłowice – 18 killed.
1990, 16 January – Halemba coal mine in Ruda Śląska – 19 killed.
1990 – Śląsk coal mine in Ruda Śląska – 4 killed.
1991 – Halemba coal mine in Ruda Śląska – 5 killed.
1993 – Miechowice coal mine in Bytom – 6 killed.
1995 – Nowy Wirek coal mine in Ruda Śląska – 5 killed.
1996 – Bielszowice coal mine in Zabrze – 5 killed.
1998, 24 February – Niwka-Modrzejów coal mine in Sosnowiec – death of 6 rescuers.
2000 – Mining enterprise in Piekary Śląskie – 3 killed.
2002, 6 February – Jas-Mos coal mine in Jastrzębie Zdrój – 10 killed.
2005, June – Pokój coal mine (Ruda Śląska) – 2 killed. In the same year in Zofiówka (Jastrzębie Zdrój), three persons died.
2006, 27 July – Pokój coal mine – 4 miners killed.
2006, 21 November – a methane explosion killed 23 people in Halemba in Ruda Śląska (2006 Halemba Coal Mine disaster).
2008, 4 June – Borynia Coal Mine blast – 6 miners killed.
2009, 18 September – a methane explosion killed 20 people in Wujek-Śląsk in Ruda Śląska (12 died in coal mine, 8 in hospitals) (2009 Wujek-Śląsk mine blast).
2018, 5 May – an earthquake trapped and killed 5 people in Zofiówka (Jastrzębie Zdrój).
2021, 5 March, an underground rockfall killed 2 people in Myslowice-Wesola in Myslowice, Silesian Voivodeship.
2022, 20-21 April, a methane explosion killed 9 people in Pniówek in Pniówek, Silesian Voivodeship. 7 miners and rescuers are missing
2022, 23 April, a mine collapse occurred in  Zofiówka (Jaastrzębie-Zdrój), killing 10 miners.

References

Lists of disasters in Poland
Disasters
 
 
Poland history-related lists
Poland